The men's 100 metre freestyle competition of the swimming events at the 1975 Pan American Games took place on 24 October. The last Pan American Games champion was Frank Heckl of US.

This race consisted of two lengths of the pool, both lengths being in freestyle.

Results
All times are in minutes and seconds.

Heats

Final 
The final was held on October 24.

References

Swimming at the 1975 Pan American Games